Nové Hamry is a municipality and village in Karlovy Vary District in the Karlovy Vary Region of the Czech Republic. It has about 300 inhabitants.

References

Villages in Karlovy Vary District
Villages in the Ore Mountains